Viktoriya Oleksandrivna Maksyuta or Victoria Maxiuta (born 15 November 1981) is a former pair skater. Competing with Vladislav Zhovnirski for Russia, she became the 1996 World Junior champion, 1997 Ondrej Nepela Memorial champion, 1998 Skate America bronze medalist, and 1999 Winter Universiade champion. She later represented Russia and Ukraine with Vitali Dubina.

Career

Partnership with Zhovnirski 
Maxiuta began appearing internationally with Vladislav Zhovnirski in 1993, representing Russia. They were awarded gold at the 1996 World Junior Championships, held from November to December 1995 in Brisbane, Australia.

The pair's first senior international medal, gold, came at the Ondrej Nepela Memorial in September 1996. Maxiuta/Zhovnirski went on to take bronze at the 1997 World Junior Championships, held in November 1996 in Seoul, South Korea; bronze at the 1998 World Junior Championships in December 1997 in Saint John, New Brunswick, Canada; and silver at the 1997–98 Junior Series Final in March 1998 in Lausanne, Switzerland.

Maxiuta/Zhovnirski began the 1998–99 season with gold medals at both of their Junior Grand Prix assignments – in Sofia, Bulgaria, and Chemnitz, Germany – before winning bronze at a senior Grand Prix event, the 1998 Skate America. In November 1998, the pair stepped onto the World Junior Championship podium for the fourth consecutive year, taking bronze in Zagreb, Croatia. In January 1999, they outscored Pang Qing / Tong Jian for gold at the Winter Universiade in Žilina, Slovakia. In March, they took bronze at the Junior Grand Prix Final in Detroit. The pair was coached by Nina Mozer.

Partnership with Dubina 
In the 1999–2000 season, Maxiuta competed with Vitali Dubina for Russia. They were awarded gold at the 1999 Ondrej Nepela Memorial and bronze at the 1999 Golden Spin of Zagreb before placing sixth at the 2000 Russian Championships.

Deciding to switch to Ukraine, the pair won two consecutive silver medals at the Ukrainian Championships and competed at two Grand Prix events, placing 8th at the 2001 Sparkassen Cup on Ice and 6th at the 2001 Cup of Russia. They were coached by Dmitri Shkidchenko in Kyiv.

Programs 
With Dubina

Competitive highlights 
GP: Grand Prix; JGP: Junior Grand Prix

With Dubina for Ukraine and Russia

With Zhovnirski for Russia

References

External links

Navigation

Ukrainian female pair skaters
Russian female pair skaters
Sportspeople from Kyiv
1981 births
Living people
World Junior Figure Skating Championships medalists
Universiade medalists in figure skating
Universiade gold medalists for Russia
Competitors at the 1999 Winter Universiade